The Hoofdklasse is the second highest echelon of korfball in the Netherlands. The division is split up in two parallel groups called Hoofdklasse A and Hoofdklasse B.

History

Champions

References

2005 establishments in the Netherlands
Sports leagues in the Netherlands
Sports leagues established in 2005